Háblame de amor (Let' s talk about love) is a Mexican telenovela produced since 1999 by TV Azteca for Azteca Digital (now Azteca Estudios). It is a remake of Amor en silencio by Liliana Abud and Eric Vonn.

Casting
The telenovela is divided into two major parts. The first part centers on Julia (Danna García) and Esteban (Bruno Bichir) as the protagonists, Max's (Ruben Delgadillo) recuperation and Guillermo's illegitimate children.

The second part features the love story between Max (now portrayed by Mauricio Ochmann) and Jimena (again, portrayed by Danna García) and Guillermo's grown up illegitimate children.

Fabian Corres portrays the eldest child, Rodrigo, in the first few episodes of the first part of the telenovela. He later portrays the youngest child, Carlos, in the second part.

Patricia Pereyra portrays Norma in this version, while in the 1988 version, she portrayed the role of Sandy Grant.

Cast

External links

1999 telenovelas
1999 Mexican television series debuts
2000 Mexican television series endings
Mexican telenovelas
TV Azteca telenovelas
Spanish-language telenovelas